Innerstaden, also called Inner City, is a city district in Malmö Municipality, Sweden. It was established on 1 July 2013 after the merger of Södra Innerstaden and Västra Innerstaden. It has a population of 67,900.

References

City districts of Malmö